Afromurzinia lutescens is a moth in the family Erebidae. It was described by Francis Walker in 1855. It is found in Angola, Cameroon, the Democratic Republic of the Congo, Equatorial Guinea, Ethiopia, Ghana, Guinea, Guinea-Bissau, Kenya, Nigeria, Sierra Leone, Somalia, South Africa, Tanzania, Togo, Uganda and Zimbabwe.

The larvae have been recorded feeding on Ornithogalum eckloni, Zea mays, Dalbergia sissoo, Eucalyptus camaldulensis, Eucalyptus deglupta, Eucalyptus torreliana, Eucalyptus rudis, Gmelina arborea and Cassia siamea.

References

Moths described in 1855
Spilosomina
Moths of Africa